Sarah Smyth (born October 12, 1982) is a Canadian actress who starred on the three seasons of the Canadian show Naked Josh and known for 50/50 (2011), Percy Jackson & the Olympians: The Lightning Thief (2010), Alien Trespass (2009) and 12 Rounds 3: Lockdown (2015).

Filmography

Film

Television

External links
 
 

1982 births
21st-century Canadian actresses
Actresses from Nova Scotia
Canadian film actresses
Canadian television actresses
Living people